This is a complete list of the people who have served as mayor of the city of Lawton in southwest Oklahoma.

Lawton's city government uses a council-manager model of municipal government where most of the authority resides in the City Council. The mayor presides and sets the agenda over the City Council whereas most of the day-to-day operations is handled by the City Manager. The mayor is elected every three years. The position is currently held by Stan Booker.

References

Lawton, Oklahoma
People from Lawton, Oklahoma